White Sitch is a 19th Century designed landscape by John Webb containing a picturesque reservoir in the middle, one mile west of Blymhill in Staffordshire, England. It is situated in a tract of cropped and mixed woodland currently owned by Bradford Estates. The woods are used for commercial plantation forestry and the reservoir for commercial carp fishing.

Etymology 

The element 'sytch' is derived from the Old English síc ("siche" in the midlands Middle English dialect). It means a "small stream of water, a rill or streamlet, esp. one flowing through flat or marshy ground, and often dry in summer; a ditch or channel through which a tiny stream flows" and is frequently used in the sense of a boundary. White Sytch lies close to the boundary of the parish.

References

Lakes of Staffordshire
South Staffordshire District